Surikiña may refer to:

 Surikiña, Bolivia a place in the Los Andes Province, La Paz Department, Bolivia
 Lake Surikiña a lake in the Pucarani Municipality, Los Andes Province, La Paz Department, Bolivia
 Surikiña River a river in the Los Andes Province, La Paz Department, Bolivia